Aurora is the second full-length album released by Nico Touches the Walls in Japan on November 25, 2009, through Ki/oon Records. The album features all three songs from their previous singles: "Kakera -Subete no Omoitachi he- ", "Big Foot" and including the opening song to Fullmetal Alchemist: Brotherhood, "Hologram".

Track listing

2009 albums
Nico Touches the Walls albums
Japanese-language albums
Sony Music albums